Lucy Peabody may refer to:

Lucy Kaopaulu Peabody  (1840–1928), high chiefess and courtier of the Kingdom of Hawaii
Lucy Whitehead McGill Waterbury Peabody (1861–1949), American Baptist missionary
Lucy Evelyn Peabody (1864-1934), American conservationist